Horotiu railway station was a station on the North Island Main Trunk in New Zealand serving Horotiu. 

The station was moved just over a mile to the north in 1880, to be 76 mi (122 km) from Auckland. It seems no explanation was given for the controversial move. The station changed its name from Pukete to Horotiu on 23 June 1907.

Traffic remained light, amounting to £49 in 1901. It was converted to a switch-out station in 1909, equipped with distant signals in 1916, when the AFFCO sidings opened, and had other alterations to signalling and interlocking in 1934, with extension of automatic signalling from Mercer to Frankton. In 1930 Frankton to Horotiu was double tracked, with automatic signalling also extended  to Mercer. Horotiu's power interlocking was the first automatic operation of main line points in the country, replacing home and distant signals, Wood's locks (a single key for signal and facing points, named after S P Woods of McKenzie and Holland) and the tablet station.

Accidents 
In 1916 a goods trains collided with wagons.

References

External links 
 1959 one inch map of location
 Google Street View of station site
 A goods train crashed into 15 standing trucks at Horotiu at night; wagons, goods and an engine are in the debris. The driver and fireman escaped injury.
 View of flag station and 1916 collision of 2 freight trains
 1937 photo of track widening
1952 photo of diesel shunter at freezing works

Defunct railway stations in New Zealand
Rail transport in Waikato
Buildings and structures in Waikato
Waikato District